Almost a Divorce is a 1931 British comedy film directed by Jack Raymond and Arthur Varney and starring Nelson Keys, Sydney Howard and Margery Binner. It was made at British and Dominion's Elstree Studios.

Cast
 Nelson Keys as Richard Leighton  
 Sydney Howard as Mackintosh  
 Margery Binner as Angela Leighton  
 Eva Moore as Aunt Isobel  
 Kay Hammond as Maisie  
 Kenneth Kove as Detective 
 Annette Benson
 Paddy Browne 
 Annie Esmond 
 Peter Penrose as Boy

References

Bibliography
 Low, Rachael. Filmmaking in 1930s Britain. George Allen & Unwin, 1985.
 Wood, Linda. British Films, 1927–1939. British Film Institute, 1986.

External links

1931 films
British comedy films
1931 comedy films
Films directed by Jack Raymond
Films directed by Arthur Varney
British black-and-white films
British and Dominions Studios films
Films shot at Imperial Studios, Elstree
1930s English-language films
1930s British films
English-language comedy films